Clan Home (pronounced and sometimes spelt Hume) is a Scottish clan. It held immense power for much of the Middle Ages and dominated the eastern Scottish Borders. It produced no fewer than eight Wardens of the Eastern March – more than any other family.

History

Origins of the clan

The Home family descends in the male-line from Cospatric I (died after 1073), the Anglo-Celtic Earl of Northumbria. His descendant William de Home (son of Sir Patrick de Greenlaw, the second son of Cospatric III, Earl of Lothian), adopted the surname following his acquisition of the lands of Home in Berwickshire in the early 13th century, through his marriage to his second cousin Ada (the daughter of Patrick I, Earl of Dunbar). William's arms featured the silver lion of Dunbar but with a green field instead of a red field, in reference to his lands of Greenlaw.

In the 14th century, William's descendant Sir Thomas Home married Nichola, heiress to the Pepdies of Dunglass. From this marriage the Homes acquired the lands of Dunglass (where they built the Collegiate Church of Dunglass, still extant today), and also began quartering their arms with those of Pepdie, being three green "papingoes" or parrots in a silver field. This is one of the earliest examples of quartering in Scottish heraldry.

Sir Thomas and Nicola had two sons. The first, Alexander, succeeded to the chieftaincy of the family, while the second, David, founded the family's principle cadet branch, the Homes of Wedderburn.

15th century

In 1402, Sir Alexander Home of that Ilk and of Dunglass was captured at the Battle of Homildon. Later he followed the Earl of Douglas to France but was killed in battle in 1424. Most of the principal cadet branches of the clan are descended from his three sons. In 1473 his great-grandson was made Great Chamberlain of Scotland and Warden of the Marches, and also created a Lord of Parliament under the title Lord Home. He joined Prince James' rebellion against his father King James III, and had a commanding role in the Battle of Sauchieburn which resulted in the death of the king.

16th century

In 1513, the 3rd Lord Home and his followers formed part of the army levied by King James IV to invade England. Lord Home led the vanguard of Scottish knights at the Battle of Flodden, and while he was fortunate enough to escape the slaughter many of his family and supporters did not. Home was later appointed as one of the counsellors to the Queen Regent. However the fortunes of the Homes suffered when the regency was transferred to the Duke of Albany. Lord Home was arrested for treason after being accused of conspiring with the English and he and his brother were executed in October 1516. Their heads were then displayed on Edinburgh Tolbooth.

The title and estates were later restored to another brother, George Home. On several occasions George Home led Border spearmen against the English. However he was thrown from his horse and died from his injuries on the eve of the Battle of Pinkie Cleugh in 1547. The Home's lands were occupied by the English, however Lord Home's son, the fifth Lord, retook them in 1549. He also supported the Scottish Reformation and sat in the Parliament of 1560 that the passed Protestant Confession of Faith.

During the politics of Mary, Queen of Scots, the Homes, like many others, shifted their allegiance more than once. Lord Home had supported the marriage of the Earl of Bothwell to Mary but he later led his men at the Battle of Langside against the queen. Then in 1573 he was arrested and convicted of treason against the young James VI of Scotland. He was released from Edinburgh Castle only after his health had failed, dying a few days later. His son, Alexander, the sixth Lord Home, was devoted to James VI and was several times ambassador to France.

17th century and civil war

When James VI of Scotland travelled to England to take possession of his new kingdom in 1603 as James I of England, he stopped at Dunglass Castle and Lord Home accompanied him to London. Home was raised to the title of Earl of Home in March 1605.

The third Earl of Home was a staunch supporter of King Charles I. In 1648 he was colonel of the Berwickshire Regiment of Foot. In 1650 when Oliver Cromwell invaded Scotland he made a point of seizing Home's castle which was then garrisoned by Parliament's troops.

18th century and Jacobite risings

The Homes also changed sides during the Jacobite risings of the eighteenth century. During the Jacobite rising of 1715, the seventh Earl of Home was imprisoned in Edinburgh Castle. His brother James Home of Ayton had his estates confiscated for his part in the rebellion.
 
During the Jacobite rising of 1745 the eighth Earl of Home joined British government forces under Sir John Cope at Dunbar. He later fought at the Battle of Prestonpans. The earl rose to the rank of Lieutenant General and was appointed Governor of Gibraltar where he died in 1761.

Henry Home, Lord Kames was a distinguished eighteenth century lawyer who published several important works on Scots law which are still highly regarded. David Hume was perhaps the most highly regarded British philosopher of the eighteenth century.

20th century

The Home family came to prominence in the twentieth century when the fourteenth earl, Alec Douglas-Home, disclaimed his hereditary peerage to become Prime Minister of the United Kingdom. However the peerage title may be revived by his heirs. The Prime Minister's brother was William Douglas-Home who was a distinguished author and playwright.

Chief
The current chief is the Right Honourable Michael, 16th Earl and Lord of Home, Lord of Dunglass, and Baron Douglas. The previous clan chief was his father, the 15th Earl, better known as David Douglas-Home.

Castles and houses
Hume Castle was the original seat of the chief of Clan Home, the Earl of Home.
The Hirsel is the current seat of the Earls of Home.
Marchmont House, Berwickshire
Fast Castle, Berwickshire
Wedderburn Castle, Berwickshire, is the seat of the senior cadet branch, Home of Wedderburn
Paxton House, Berwickshire
Hutton Castle, Berwickshire
Ayton Castle, Berwickshire
Moray House, Edinburgh, was built by the Countess of Home in the 1620s.
Dunglass Castle, East Lothian
Manderston, Berwickshire
Blackadder House, Berwickshire
Kimmerghame House, Berwickshire
Redbraes Castle, Berwickshire
Bassendean House, Berwickshire

Military Association
A British Army unit – The 40th Regiment Royal Artillery (40 Regt RA) – had a longstanding association with Clan Home.  Until entering suspended animation as part of the 2010 SDSR, 40 Regt RA (The Lowland Gunners) bore the Home tartan on a number of dress items.  Every Officer and Soldier wore a Home Tartan rank slide; Officers wore Home Tartan trews with dinner jackets often in lieu of Mess Dress (unofficially referred to as 'Lowland Order') and the Regimental Pipes and Drums also wore Home tartan kilts, trews and other accoutrements.  After moving from Topcliffe, North Yorkshire, England to Thiepval Barracks in Lisburn, Northern Ireland as part of an Army wide rebasing plan in 2009, the regiment renamed its purpose-built technical accommodation 'Home Lines', formally opened by General Sir Timothy Granville-Chapman in 2010 at a ceremony attended by senior members of Clan Home.  Additionally, the Commanding Officer's designated residence was named 'Home House', the naming of which caused some perplexity years later amongst those unaware of the correct pronunciation and the relationship between the regiment and the clan!  Following the demise of 40 Regt RA, some of the Home linkages were taken forward to the Royal Artillery's other Scottish regiment, 19th Regiment Royal Artillery where they are carried on today.

See also
Scottish clan
Home baronets
Hume baronets
Earl of Home

References

Paul, James Balfour (ed.). (1904–14). Sir Robert Douglas’s Peerage of Scotland, 9 volumes.

External links
Official Clan Home Association website
ScotClans – Home History page
Electric Scotland – Home details

Home